The Saline Cemetery is one of the older cemeteries in Drew County, Arkansas. The Allis area was settled in 1860, and local residents established the Saline Associate Reform Presbyterian Church the following year, and the cemetery was established on the church grounds. The oldest inscribed grave dates to 1878, and is that of a member of the Davis family, early settlers whose descendants continue to maintain the cemetery. A number of the area's early settlers are among the more than 100 graves in the cemetery.

The cemetery was listed on the National Register of Historic Places in 2011.

See also
 National Register of Historic Places listings in Drew County, Arkansas

References

External links
 

Cemeteries on the National Register of Historic Places in Arkansas
Buildings and structures completed in 1878
Buildings and structures in Drew County, Arkansas
Geography of Drew County, Arkansas
National Register of Historic Places in Drew County, Arkansas
Cemeteries established in the 1870s